Thomas Shields may refer to:

 Tom Shields (born 1991), American swimmer
 Thomas Todhunter Shields (1873–1955), leader of the fundamentalist religious movement in Canada